Lanoraie or Lanoraye may refer to:

 Lanoraye Lake, a body of water at the head of the rivière du Malin in Capitale-Nationale, Quebec, Canada
 Lanoraie, Quebec, a municipality of Quebec, Canada